The colossal squid (Mesonychoteuthis hamiltoni) is part of the family Cranchiidae. It is sometimes called the Antarctic squid or giant cranch squid and is believed to be the largest squid species in terms of mass. It is the only recognized member of the genus Mesonychoteuthis and is known from only a small number of specimens. The colossal squid has the largest eyes of any known creature ever to exist, with an estimated diameter of 30–40 cm (12–16 in). 

The species has similar anatomy to other members of its family although it is the only member of Cranchiidae to display hooks on its arms and tentacles. It is known to inhabit the circumantarctic Southern Ocean. Although little is known about the behaviour, it is known to use bioluminescence to attract prey. It is presumed to be an ambush predator, and is a major prey of the sperm whale.

The first specimens were discovered and described in 1925. In 1981, an adult specimen was discovered, and in 2003 a second specimen was collected.

Morphology
The colossal squid shares features common to all squids: a mantle for locomotion, one pair of gills, and certain external characteristics like eight arms and two tentacles, a head, and two fins. In general, it is safe to describe the morphology and anatomy of the colossal squid the same way one would describe any other squid. However, there are certain morphological / anatomical characteristics that separate the colossal squid from other squids in its family: The colossal squid is the only squid in its family with hooks, either swivelling or three-pointed, equipped on its arms and tentacles. There are squids in other families that also have hooks, but no other squid in the family Cranchiidae.

The giant squid also exhibits deep-sea gigantism but the colossal squid is heavier. However, giant squids are usually longer: up to 13m, compared with up to 10m for colossal squid. 

Distribution and habitat
The squid's known range extends thousands of kilometres north of Antarctica to southern South America, southern South Africa, and the southern tip of New Zealand, making it primarily an inhabitant of the entire circumantarctic Southern Ocean. Colossal squid are also sighted often near Cooperation Sea and less near Ross Sea because of its predator and competitor, the Antarctic toothfish. The region between the Weddell Sea and the western Kerguelen archipelago has been deemed a “hotspot” based on characteristics of the habitat. The squid's vertical distribution appears to correlate directly with age.

Behavior

Feeding 

Little is known about their behaviour, but it is believed to feed on prey such as chaetognatha, large fish such as the Patagonian toothfish, and smaller squid in the deep ocean using bioluminescence. A recent study by Remeslo, Yakushev and Laptikhovsky revealed that Antarctic toothfish make up a significant part of the colossal squid's diet; of the 8,000 toothfish brought aboard trawlers between 2011 and 2014, seventy-one showed clear signs of attack by colossal squid. A study in Prydz Bay region of Antarctica found squid remains in a female colossal squid's stomach, suggesting the possibility of cannibalism within this species. Studies measuring the δ15N content of the chitinous beaks of cephalopods to determine trophic ecology levels have demonstrated that the colossal squid is a top predator that is positively correlated with its increased size. This new confirmation of the colossal squid's trophic level suggests that it likely preys on large fishes and smaller squids, according to its size, and that its predators include sperm whales and sleeper sharks.

Metabolism 
Estimates of its energy requirements suggest it is a slow-moving ambush predator, using its large eyes primarily for prey-detection rather than engaging in active hunting.

Predation 
Many sperm whales have scars on their backs, believed to be caused by the hooks of colossal squid. Colossal squid are a major prey item for sperm whales in the Antarctic; 14% of the squid beaks found in the stomachs of these sperm whales are those of the colossal squid, which indicates that colossal squid make up 77% of the biomass consumed by these whales. Many other animals also feed on colossal squid, including the beaked whales, such as southern bottlenose whales, Cuvier's and Baird's beaked whales; the beaked whales essentially resemble oversized dolphins, some with a more pronounced underbite on their snout (or "beak"). They are among the deepest-diving cetaceans ever recorded, besides the sperm whale. This places the beaked whales as some of the few food competitors of the sperm whale. Other possible squid predators include the pilot whale, killer whales, larger southern elephant seals, Patagonian toothfish, southern sleeper sharks (Somniosus antarcticus), Antarctic toothfish, and albatrosses (e.g., the wandering and sooty albatrosses). However, beaks from mature adults have only been recovered from large predators (i.e. sperm whales and southern sleeper sharks), while the other predators only eat juveniles or young adults.

Reproduction 
Little is known about the colossal squid's reproductive cycle although the colossal squid does have two distinct sexes. Many species of squid, however, develop sex-specific organs as they age and develop. The adult female colossal squid has been discovered in much shallower waters which likely implies that females spawn in shallower waters than their normal depth. Additionally, the colossal squid has a high possible fecundity reaching over 4.2 million oocytes which is quite unique compared to other squids in such cold waters. Colossal squid oocytes have been observed at sizes ranging from as large as 3.2x2.1 mm to as small as 1.4x0.5 mm. Sampling of colossal squid ovaries show an average of 2175 eggs per gram.

Vision 
For pelagic organisms of similar weight to the colossal squid, such as the swordfish, the average eye diameter required for visual detection is 10 cm, but colossal squid's are as large as 27 cm. The allowed increase in visual detection strategies, including reduced diffraction blurring and greater contrast distinction, must be extremely beneficial to the colossal squid to justify the large energetic expenses to grow, move, camouflage, and maintain these eyes. The colossal squid's increased pupil size has been mathematically proven to overcome the visual complications of the pelagic zone (the combination of downwelling daylight, bioluminescence, and light scattering with increasing distance), especially by monitoring larger volumes of water at once and by detecting long-range changes in plankton bioluminescence via the physical disruption of large moving objects (e.g., sperm whales).

The colossal squid's eyes glow in the dark via long rectangularly shaped light-producing photophores located next to the lens on the front of both eyeballs. Symbiotic bacteria reside within these photophores and luminesce through chemical reaction.

It is hypothesized that the colossal squid's eyes can detect predator movement beyond 120 m, which is the upper limit of the sperm whale's sonar range.

Hearing 
Although squid cannot hear sound, they can detect the movement of sound waves via organs called statocysts (similar to the human cochlea). Squid statocysts likely respond to low frequency sounds less than 500 Hz, similar to pelagic fish. Colossal squid are essentially deaf to high frequencies (like whale sonar), so they rely largely on visual detection mechanisms to avoid predation.

Taxonomy and history

The colossal squid, species Mesonychoteuthis hamiltoni, was discovered in 1925. This species belongs to the class Cephalopoda and family Cranchiidae.

Most of the time, full colossal squid specimens are not collected; as of 2015, only 12 complete colossal squids had ever been recorded with only half of these being full adults.
Commonly, beak remnants of the colossal squid are collected; 55 beaks of colossal squids have been recorded in total. Less commonly (four times), a fin, mantle, arm or tentacle of a colossal squid was collected.

Notable discoveries

First specimens 
The species was first discovered in the form of two arm crowns found in the stomach of a sperm whale in the winter of 1924–1925. This species, then named Mesonychoteuthis hamiltoni after E. Hamilton who made the initial discovery, was formally described by Guy Coburn Robson in 1925.

Entire specimens 
In 2005, the first full living specimen was captured at a depth of  while taking a toothfish from a longline off South Georgia Island. Although the mantle was not brought aboard, its length was estimated at over 2.5 m (8 feet 3 inches), and the tentacles measured .

Largest known specimen 

The largest recorded specimen was a female, which are thought to be larger than males, captured in February 2007 by a New Zealand fishing boat in the Ross Sea off of Antarctica. The squid was close to dead when it was captured and subsequently was taken back to New Zealand for scientific study. The specimen was initially estimated to measure about 10 metres in total length and weigh about 450 kg.

Defrosting and dissection, April–May 2008 
Thawing and dissection of the specimen took place at the Museum of New Zealand Te Papa Tongarewa. AUT biologist Steve O'Shea, Tsunemi Kubodera, and AUT biologist Kat Bolstad were invited to the museum to aid in the process. Media reports suggested scientists at the museum were considering using a giant microwave to defrost the squid because thawing it at room temperature would take several days and it would likely begin to decompose on the outside while the core remained frozen. However, they later opted for the more conventional approach of thawing the specimen in a bath of salt water. After thawing, it was found that the specimen was 495 kg with a mantle length of 2.5 m and total length of only 4.2 m, probably because the tentacles shrank once the squid was dead.

Parts of the specimen have been examined:

The beak is considerably smaller than some found in the stomachs of sperm whales, suggesting other colossal squid are much larger than this one.
This is the largest eye of any known animal. These measurements are of the partly collapsed specimen; alive, the eye was probably 30 to 40 cm (12 to 16 in) across.
Inspection of the specimen with an endoscope revealed ovaries containing thousands of eggs.

Exhibition

The Museum of New Zealand Te Papa Tongarewa began displaying this specimen from 13 December 2008. The exhibition was closed between 2018 and 2019, but is currently open again for public viewing at Te Papa.

Second specimen
In August 2014, Te Papa received a second colossal squid, captured in early 2014.

Conservation status
The colossal squid has been assessed as "least concern" on the IUCN Red List. Furthermore, colossal squid are not targeted by fishermen; rather, they are only caught when they attempt to feed on fish caught on hooks. Additionally, due to their habitat, interactions between humans and colossal squid are considered rare.

See also
Kraken
Giant squid

References

Further reading

 
 Klumov, S.K. & V.L. Yukhov 1975. Mesonychoteuthis hamiltoni Robson, 1925 (Cephalopoda, Oegopsida). Antarktika Doklady Komission 14: 159–189. [English translation: TT 81–59176, Al Ahram Center for Scientific Translations]

External Links

 Tree of Life web project: Mesonychoteuthis hamiltoni
 Museum of New Zealand Te Papa Tongarewa(Te Papa) Colossal Squid Specimen Information
 Museum of New Zealand Te Papa Tongarewa(Te Papa) Colossal Squid Images and Video
 Tonmo.com: Giant Squid and Colossal Squid Fact Sheet
 New Zealand Herald: Fishermen haul in world's biggest squid
 USA Today: Colossal Squid Caught in Antarctic Waters
 BBC: Super squid surfaces in Antarctic
 MarineBio: Mesonychoteuthis hamiltoni

Squid
Fauna of the Southern Ocean
Fauna of Antarctica
Bioluminescent molluscs
Cenozoic cephalopods
Pliocene molluscs
Molluscs described in 1925